Raja is a 1943 Hindi film directed by Kishore Sahu. It was the first film from the newly established "Purnima Productions". A social satire, it starred Kishore Sahu and Protima Das Gupta in the lead. The music was composed by Khan Mastana, and Kishore Sahu sang the songs picturised on him. The rest of the cast included Ramesh Gupta, Gulab, Moni Chatterjee, Badri Prasad and Rani Bala.

The film performed well at the box-office in centres like Delhi and Bombay. Filmindia editor Baburao Patel stated that Raja "remains a milestone of art and skill in motion pictures".

Cast
 Protima Das Gupta
 Kishore Sahu
 Ranibala
 Moni Chatterjee
 Ramesh Gupta
 Gulab
 Badri Prasad
 Wasker
 Anant Prabhu
 Samson
 Vijay Sahu

Soundtrack
The music director was Khan Mastana, with lyrics by Bhagwati Charan Sharma, Rammurti Chaturvedi and Amritlal Nagar. The singers were Protima Das Gupta, Kishore Sahu, Gulab and Ramesh Gupta.

Song List

References

External links

1943 films
1940s Hindi-language films
Films directed by Kishore Sahu
Films scored by Khan Mastana
Indian black-and-white films